Alta Vista is a city in Wabaunsee County, Kansas, United States.  As of the 2020 census, the population of the city was 409.

History
Alta Vista was founded in 1887, and it was incorporated as a city in 1905. Alta Vista is derived from the Spanish word for "high view", and the city was so named from its lofty elevation.

In 1887, the Chicago, Kansas and Nebraska Railway built a main line from Topeka through Alta Vista to Herington.  The Chicago, Kansas and Nebraska Railway was foreclosed in 1891 and taken over by Chicago, Rock Island and Pacific Railway, which shut down in 1980 and reorganized as Oklahoma, Kansas and Texas Railroad, merged in 1988 with Missouri Pacific Railroad, merged in 1997 with Union Pacific Railroad.  Most locals still refer to this railroad as the "Rock Island".

The first post office in Alta Vista was established in March 1887.

Geography

Climate
The climate in this area is characterized by hot, humid summers and generally mild to cool winters.  According to the Köppen Climate Classification system, Alta Vista has a humid subtropical climate, abbreviated "Cfa" on climate maps.

Demographics

Alta Vista is part of the Topeka, Kansas Metropolitan Statistical Area.

2010 census
As of the census of 2010, there were 444 people, 189 households, and 128 families residing in the city. The racial makeup of the city was 98.2% White, 0.7% African American, 0.2% Native American, 0.2% Asian, and 0.7% from two or more races. Hispanic or Latino of any race were 4.3% of the population.

There were 189 households, of which 32.3% had children under the age of 18 living with them, 51.9% were married couples living together, 10.6% had a female householder with no husband present, 5.3% had a male householder with no wife present, and 32.3% were non-families. 28.6% of all households were made up of individuals, and 10.5% had someone living alone who was 65 years of age or older. The average household size was 2.35 and the average family size was 2.80.

The median age in the city was 41.5 years. 25% of residents were under the age of 18; 5.5% were between the ages of 18 and 24; 24.4% were from 25 to 44; 29.7% were from 45 to 64; and 15.5% were 65 years of age or older. The gender makeup of the city was 52.3% male and 47.7% female.

2000 census
As of the census of 2000, there were 442 people, 190 households, and 126 families residing in the city. The racial makeup of the city was 97.29% White, 1.36% Native American, 0.68% Pacific Islander, and 0.68% from two or more races. Hispanic or Latino of any race were 4.07% of the population.

There were 190 households, out of which 30.0% had children under the age of 18 living with them, 52.1% were married couples living together, 10.5% had a female householder with no husband present, and 33.2% were non-families. 31.1% of all households were made up of individuals, and 16.8% had someone living alone who was 65 years of age or older. The average household size was 2.33 and the average family size was 2.90.

In the city, the population was spread out, with 24.0% under the age of 18, 7.7% from 18 to 24, 25.3% from 25 to 44, 27.4% from 45 to 64, and 15.6% who were 65 years of age or older. The median age was 41 years. For every 100 females, there were 113.5 males. For every 100 females age 18 and over, there were 103.6 males.

The median income for a household in the city was $32,159, and the median income for a family was $38,542. Males had a median income of $29,167 versus $20,833 for females. The per capita income for the city was $15,885. About 8.0% of families and 9.9% of the population were below the poverty line, including 15.5% of those under age 18 and 11.4% of those age 65 or over.

Education
The community is served by Morris County USD 417 public school district.

Alta Vista High School was closed through school unification.  The Alta Vista High School mascot was Bulldogs.

Infrastructure

Transportation
Alta Vista is served by the Union Pacific Railroad, formerly the Southern Pacific, and prior, the Chicago, Rock Island and Pacific Railroad. Alta Vista is located on UP's Golden State main line to El Paso, Texas. The line was originally built by the Chicago, Kansas and Nebraska Railroad.

References

Further reading

 Living in the Depot: The Two-Story Railroad Station; H. Roger Grant; University of Iowa Press; 130 pages; 1993; .  Contains historic images of Kansas stations at Alta Vista, Bucklin, Comiskey, Haddam, Hoyt, and Wakarusa.

External links

 Alta Vista - Directory of Public Officials
 Alta Vista city map, KDOT

Cities in Kansas
Cities in Wabaunsee County, Kansas
Topeka metropolitan area, Kansas